The Men's Downhill in the 2021 FIS Alpine Skiing World Cup consisted of seven events. The original schedule had contained nine downhills, but a rescheduled one on 5 March in Saalbach-Hinterglemm, Austria, was canceled due to fog and continual snowfall after just nine skiers had finished (with 30 needed to make the race official), and (as discussed below) the downhill during World Cup finals week was also canceled.

The first downhill of the season, conducted in good conditions in Val d'Isère, France, took an unusual turn when Martin Čater of Slovenia, starting 41st, unexpectedly recorded the winning time . . . eleven racers after the organizers had already held the unofficial podium ceremony and the television broadcasters had ended coverage. After that, the season returned to normal, and three=time defending champion Beat Feuz opened up a 48-point lead over his nearest rival, Matthias Mayer of Austria, with only three events to go. But then the first downhill at Saalbach-Hinterglemm was cancelled, Feuz gained 20 more points on Meyer at the second downhill there, and, at the World Cup final (scheduled for Wednesday, 17 March in Lenzerheide, Switzerland), three straight days of heavy snowfall caused the downhill finals to be cancelled. Thus Feuz, who had previously won two downhills on the Hahnenkamm in Kitzbühel during the season, won the discipline's crystal globe without a final showdown.

The season was interrupted by the 2021 World Ski Championships, which were held from 8–21 February in Cortina d'Ampezzo, Italy.  The men's downhill took place on 14 February 2021.

Standings

DNF = Did Not Finish
DNS = Did Not Start

See also
 2021 Alpine Skiing World Cup – Men's summary rankings
 2021 Alpine Skiing World Cup – Men's Overall
 2021 Alpine Skiing World Cup – Men's Super-G
 2021 Alpine Skiing World Cup – Men's Giant Slalom
 2021 Alpine Skiing World Cup – Men's Slalom
 2021 Alpine Skiing World Cup – Men's Parallel
 World Cup scoring system

References

External links
 Alpine Skiing at FIS website

External links
 

Men's Downhill
FIS Alpine Ski World Cup men's downhill discipline titles